The 2006 Rhode Island gubernatorial election took place on November 7, 2006. Incumbent Republican Donald Carcieri very narrowly defeated Democratic Lieutenant Governor Charles J. Fogarty in one of the closest gubernatorial elections in Rhode Island history. With a margin of 2%, this election was also the second-closest race of the 2006 gubernatorial election cycle, behind only the election in Minnesota.

, this was the last time a Republican was elected Governor of Rhode Island or to a statewide office. This is also the last time the Republican candidates won the counties of Bristol and Washington.

Republican primary

Candidates
Donald Carcieri, incumbent Governor of Rhode Island

Results

Democratic primary

Candidates
Charles J. Fogarty, Lieutenant Governor of Rhode Island, former Rhode Island State Senator

Results

General election

Predictions

Polling

Results

The 2006 gubernatorial election was one of the closest in the history of Rhode Island. Carcieri won all but one county. However, the one county that went for Fogarty was Providence County, home to Providence, Rhode Island, which is heavily populated and known for favoring Democrats. The race at one point was only at a margin of 4,000 votes. Finally at 3:48 A.M. on November 8, Carcieri was declared the winner by the Associated Press. Fogarty conceded early the next morning.

References

External links
Official campaign websites (Archived)
Don Carcieri
Charles Fogarty

2006
Gubernatorial
Rhode Island